Kim Sajet is a Nigerian-born art historian, curator, and museum director. She has been the director of the Smithsonian's National Portrait Gallery since 2013, and is the first woman to serve in that role. During her tenure at the museum, she has worked to increase representation of women and minorities in the Portrait Gallery's collection.

Biography 
Sajet was born in Nigeria and raised in Australia from the age of four, she is a citizen of the Netherlands. She has a doctorate in liberal studies from Georgetown University, a Master's degree in art history from Bryn Mawr College, a master's degree in business administration, and bachelor's degree in art history  from University of Melbourne, and a graduate diploma in museum studies from Deakin University.

Starting on April 1, 2013, Sajet served as director of the Smithsonian's National Portrait Gallery in Washington D.C. This role was following a stint as the president and CEO of the Historical Society of Pennsylvania. Prior to that role, she was a deputy director of the Pennsylvania Academy of Fine Arts and spent time as a curator and director at two Australian art museums.

See also 
 Women in the art history field

Publications

References

Living people
Year of birth missing (living people)
Directors of museums in the United States
Australian curators
Australian women curators
University of Melbourne alumni
Bryn Mawr College alumni
Nigerian women curators
Smithsonian Institution people